Van den Bossche or Vandenbossche is a Dutch surname originating in Flanders. It means either "from the woods" or "from Den Bosch". Notable people with the surname include:

 Aert van den Bossche (fl. 1499-1505), Flemish painter
 Agnes van den Bossche (c.1435 – c.1504), Flemish painter
 Alain Van Den Bossche (born 1965), Belgian racing cyclist
 Balthasar van den Bossche (1681–1715), Flemish painter
 Bart Van den Bossche (1964–2013), Flemish singer
 Dany Vandenbossche (1956–2013), Belgian politician
 Darla Vandenbossche (born 1963), Canadian actress
 David Vandenbossche (born 1980), French footballer
 Fabio Van den Bossche (born 2000), Belgian cyclist
 Freya Van den Bossche (born 1975), Belgian politician
 Georges Van Den Bossche (1892-1966), Belgian rower
 Gielis van den Bossche (c.1490 – after 1545), Flemish painter
 Jules van den Bossche (1819–1889), Dutch military officer and colonial government official
 Luc Van den Bossche (born 1947), Belgian politician
 Martin Van Den Bossche (born 1941), Belgian bicycle racer
 Oscar Van Den Bossche (1893-1927), Belgian rower
 Peter Van Den Bossche (born 1959), Belgian professor of international law
 Willy Van Den Bossche (born 1949), Belgian archer
 Yani Van den Bossche (born 2001), Belgian professional footballer

See also
 Van den Bos
 Van den Bosch
 Vandenbussche

Dutch-language surnames
Surnames of Belgian origin
Surnames of Dutch origin